The 1976 Race of Champions was a non-championship Formula One race held at Brands Hatch on 14 March 1976. The 40-lap race was won by James Hunt, driving a McLaren-Cosworth, with Alan Jones second in a Surtees-Cosworth and Jacky Ickx third in a Hesketh-Cosworth entered by Wolf-Williams Racing.

Qualifying

Classification

1 Brambilla and Nilsson were both penalised one minute for jumping the start.

References 

http://www.silhouet.com/motorsport/archive/f1/nc/1976/1976.html#roc
http://www.formula2.net/F176_1.htm

Race of Champions (Brands Hatch)
Race of Champions
Gold
Race of Champions